Ane Hansen (born 1961) is a Greenlandic politician. A member of the Inuit Ataqatigiit, she was Minister for Fisheries, Hunting and Agriculture 2009–13. She has been the mayor of Qeqertalik Municipality since the position was established on 1 January 2018.

References

Living people
Government ministers of Greenland
Greenlandic Inuit people
Inuit Ataqatigiit politicians
Greenlandic socialists
21st-century Greenlandic politicians
21st-century Danish women politicians
Women government ministers of Greenland
1961 births